The banderas monumentales (Spanish for "monumental flags") are a collection of tall flagpoles containing large flags of Mexico located throughout Mexico. They are part of a program started in 1999 under President Ernesto Zedillo that is currently administered by the Secretariat of National Defense (Secretaría de la Defensa Nacional). The main feature of these monuments (though not the biggest, see below) is a giant Mexican flag flying off a 50-meter-high (160-ft) flagpole. In the time after the decree was issued, many more banderas monumentales have been installed throughout the country in various sizes. Many of the locations were chosen due to significant events in Mexican history that occurred there.

The 1999 decree 
On July 1, 1999, President Zedillo officially started the flag program by issuing a decree that was published in the government register Official Journal of the Federation. While the formation of the flag project was one aspect of the decree, the overall aims of the law were to promote the flag, the Coat of Arms and the national anthem to instill a sense of patriotism into the Mexican population. Zedillo also used the timeframe of 1995 until 2000 to promote Mexican culture and history. Finally, this decree allowed the governors of each state to display more conspicuously the national symbols (Símbolos Patrios) throughout their state.

The flag program 
The deployment of banderas monumentales was outlined by Zedillo in a two-point program. The first point consisted of selecting the location for the monumental flags, of which the first were:

Those in the military base Campo Marte, in downtown, and in the San Jerónimo roundabout in Mexico City
Tijuana, Baja California
Ciudad Juárez, Chihuahua 
Veracuz, Veracruz 
Iguala, Guerrero

The first two deployments were in México City, Mexico's capital. The next two were in Tijuana and Ciudad Juárez, along the northern border with the United States. Veracruz is Mexico's main seaport in the Gulf of Mexico. Finally, Iguala was where the flag of the Three Guarantees (Bandera de las Tres Garantías) recognized as Mexico's first flag, was created.

The second point in the program accounted for the creation of a standard size for the flags and the poles they would be raised on. The flag size is close to the 4:7 ratio as stated in Article 3 of the Law on the National Coat of Arms, Flag and Anthem (Ley sobre el Escudo, la Bandera y el Himno Nacionales).

There have been smaller flags called banderas semi-monumentales installed for schools, smaller communities and other locations where logistics complicate the flying a giant flag. The flags are greatly smaller than its those outlined in the 1999 decree, but have the advantages that are cheaper and easier to take down than the monumental flags. Monumental flags are costly to construct and require a group of nearly twenty people to raise and lower them.

Biggest flags 
It was inaugurated on the Día de la Bandera (Flag Day), February 24, 2005. Another flag with similar proportions is located in the city of Dolores Hidalgo, Guanajuato, the Cradle of Mexican Independence.

Current locations 
Since the construction of the first monumental flags, other cities throughout the country have also deployed their own. They are mostly located in state capitals, historical towns and cities with important economic activity.

 Monterrey, Nuevo León   
 Dolores Hidalgo, Cuna de la Independencia Nacional, Guanajuato   
 Querétaro, Querétaro
 México City (three locations):
Zócalo, in the city center. 
Campo Militar Marte (1 km northwest of Los Pinos)   
San Jerónimo    
 Iguala, Guerrero   
 Tonalá, Jalisco
 Piedras Negras, Coahuila 
 Tijuana, Baja California   
 Chihuahua, Chihuahua
 Ciudad Juárez, Chihuahua   
 Veracruz, Veracruz
 Morelia, Michoacán
 Tehuacán, Puebla
 San Luis Potosí, San Luis Potosí
 El Calvario, Toluca
 Cuautla and Cuernavaca, Morelos
 Culiacán and Mazatlán, Sinaloa
 Mérida, Yucatán
 Cancún, Quintana Roo
 Naucalpan, Estado de México
 Nuevo Laredo, Tamaulipas   
 Ciudad Victoria, Tamaulipas
 Tampico, Tamaulipas
 Celaya, Guanajuato
 Irapuato, Guanajuato
 Ensenada, Baja California   
 Acapulco, Guerrero   
 San Miguel de Allende, Guanajuato
 Cozumel, Quintana Roo

The Tijuana, Ciudad Juárez and Nuevo Laredo flags overlook the United States border and can be clearly seen from the U. S. side.

Gallery

References 
 Mexico - Giant flags
  Secretariat of Interior of Mexico (article)

External links
 Google maps photo of a bandera monumental at Nuevo Laredo, Mexico
 Photo of a bandera monumental at Tijuana, B.C., Mexico seen across the border from the United States side in San Ysidro, California

Mexican culture
Flags of Mexico
1999 in Mexico
Flagpoles